Max Moritz Warburg (5 June 1867 – 26 December 1946) was a German banker and scion of the wealthy Warburg family based in Hamburg, Germany.

Early life
Max Warburg was one of seven children born to Moritz Warburg, the director of the family's Hamburg bank, and his wife Charlotte Oppenheim of the Oppenheim family, another prominent German-Jewish banking family.

His siblings were art historian and cultural theorist Abraham Warburg; chief architect of the Federal Reserve Board of the United States Paul Warburg; Felix, son-in-law to Jacob Schiff and partner at Kuhn, Loeb & Co.; Fritz; Olga; and Louisa.

Career
He apprenticed in Frankfurt, Amsterdam, Paris, and London.  From 1910 until 1938, he was director of M. M. Warburg & Co. in Hamburg, Germany. As head of that firm, he advised Kaiser Wilhelm II prior to World War I.

In the 1930s, despite the rise of the Nazi Party, Warburg felt there was hope for the future in Germany and tried to wait out the Nazi crisis. From 1933, he served on the board of the German Reichsbank under governor Hjalmar Schacht. He sold the bank because the 1935 Nuremberg laws set the framework and campaign of Aryanization. He then emigrated to the United States in 1938.

Personal life
Max Warburg married Alice Magnus in 1899, and together they had four daughters (including Lola Helene Nina Hahn-Warburg, who instigated the Kindertransport initiative to the United Kingdom) and a son, Eric Warburg (1900–1990), who served during WW2 and was later involved with the OSS, along with founding E.M. Warburg & Co, later known as Warburg Pincus. His company did deals on Wall Street with help of people like Alan Dulles, and he maintained a close relationship with John J. McCloy over the years.

See also
 Warburg family

References

External links
 

1867 births
1946 deaths
American bankers
German bankers
Jewish bankers
Jews from Hamburg
Jewish emigrants from Nazi Germany to the United States
Max